The earliest recorded Mayor of Oxford in England was Laurence Kepeharm (1205–1207?).

On 23 October 1962 the city was granted the honour of electing a Lord Mayor. Notable figures who have been Lord Mayor of Oxford include J. N. L. Baker (1964–65), Air-Vice-Marshal William Foster MacNeece Foster (1966–67) and Olive Gibbs (1974–75 and 1981–82).

List of notable Mayors

List of Lord Mayors

References

 
 
People from Oxford
Local government in Oxford
Oxford
Mayors
Oxford mayors